Reed De Rouen (10 June 1917 – 11 June 1986) was an American actor and screenwriter who worked mostly in the British film and television industry. He appeared in the Doctor Who serial The Gunfighters in 1966 as Pa Clanton, as well as writing the script for the proposed Doctor Who story "The Spare Part People" with Jon Pertwee.

Filmography

 The Third Man (1949) – American Military Policeman at Railroad Station (uncredited)
 The Strangers Came (1949) – Manager
 The Six Men (1951) – Lewis
 Lady in the Fog (1952) – Connors – the thug
 Top Secret (1952) – 1st U.S. Soldier
 Sea Devils (1953) – Customs Man (uncredited)
 The One That Got Away (1957) – Canadian Truck Driver (uncredited)
 The Sheriff of Fractured Jaw (1958) – Clayborne
 Naked Fury (1959) – Eddy
 John Paul Jones (1959) – Joseph Hawes
 Murder at Site 3 (1959) – McGill
 There Was a Crooked Man (1960) – Dutchman
 The Hand (1960) – Michael Brodie
 Man Who Couldn't Walk (1960) – Luigi
 The Traitors (1962)
 Billion Dollar Brain (1967) – 1st Observer
 The Revolutionary (1970) – Mayor
 You Can't Win 'Em All (1970) – U.S. Navy CPO (uncredited)
 Baxter! (1973) – Poker player (final film role)

References

External links
 

1917 births
1986 deaths
American male film actors
American male screenwriters
Writers from Green Bay, Wisconsin
20th-century American male actors
American expatriate male actors in the United Kingdom
Screenwriters from Wisconsin
20th-century American male writers
20th-century American screenwriters